El Ayem El Djazairia is an Arabic-language Algerian daily newspaper. It was started in 2005 and contains national and international news on different subjects including politics, economics, arts and sports.

References

2005 establishments in Algeria
Newspapers published in Algeria
Arabic-language newspapers
Publications established in 2005
Mass media in Algiers